The ADT Skills Challenge was an offseason event in golf which tests golfers' abilities in putting, driving distance, and the short game (i.e. bunker shots and chip shots). Baseball superstar Mark McGwire beat out a field of professionals to win in 2003.

Winners

References
Results on PGA Tour's official site

PGA Tour unofficial money events
Recurring sporting events established in 1992